Canterbury College was a private institution located in Danville, Indiana, United States from 1878 to 1951.  The school was known as Central Normal College prior to 1946.

History
The college was founded in 1876 as part of the larger statewide university system in Indiana. The school was located in Ladoga, Indiana, but was moved to Danville, Indiana in 1878 after purchasing the former Danville Academy buildings. Normal Hall is the only remaining building associated with the Central Indiana Normal School at Ladoga. It was listed on the National Register of Historic Places in 1996.

The school taught traditional college courses, but primarily focused on training teachers. Over 75,000 teachers were trained while the school was in operation.  In 1942 the school buildings were taken over by the Northern Diocese of the Episcopal Church and the college was renamed Canterbury College, but it continued as a normal school until closing in 1951 due to bankruptcy. The old Administration Building and the Chapel were torn down, but Hargrave Hall and the C.C. Bostick Gymnasium were used as the Danville Community High School and then the Danville Community Middle School until 2009.

The building is currently used for Ivy Tech classes in conjunction with Danville Community High School and is referred to as Central Normal Campus. In addition to housing educational facilities, it also houses the Danville Police Department as well Danville Athletic Club.

The majority of the College's records and archive materials are maintained by Indiana State University.

Notable alumni
The school's alumni include:

Samuel Ralston, a United States Senator and the 28th Indiana Governor,
U.S. Representative William Larrabee
U.S. Representative William La Follette
MLB pitcher Vic Aldridge,
John Cravens, long-time university administrator
David Myers, Justice of the Indiana Supreme Court
Jim Springer, former professional basketball player
George Tremain, Justice of the Indiana Supreme Court
Lewis Terman, human development psychologist.
William H. Stead, Illinois Attorney General, also went to the school.
Frank W. Griese, Mayor of Evansville, Indiana (1930–1935)
John W. Spencer, Chief Justice of the Indiana Supreme Court

References

External links
 Hendricks County Historical Museum: Central Normal College
 Hendricks County Heritage Digital Collection

 
Defunct private universities and colleges in Indiana
Education in Hendricks County, Indiana
Educational institutions established in 1876
Educational institutions disestablished in 1951
1876 establishments in Indiana
1951 disestablishments in Indiana